In mathematics, signed measure is a generalization of the concept of (positive) measure by allowing the set function to take negative values.

Definition

There are two slightly different concepts of a signed measure, depending on whether or not one allows it to take infinite values.  Signed measures are usually only allowed to take finite real values, while some textbooks allow them to take infinite values. To avoid confusion, this article will call these two cases "finite signed measures" and "extended signed measures".

Given a measurable space  (that is, a set  with a σ-algebra  on it), an extended signed measure is a set function

for any sequence  of disjoint sets in 
The series on the right must converge absolutely when the value of the left-hand side is finite. The expression  is undefined and must be avoided.

A finite signed measure (a.k.a. real measure) is defined in the same way, except that it is only allowed to take real values. That is, it cannot take  or 

Finite signed measures form a real vector space, while extended signed measures do not because they are not closed under addition. On the other hand, measures are extended signed measures, but are not in general finite signed measures.

Examples
Consider a non-negative measure  on the space (X, Σ) and a measurable function f: X → R such that

Then, a finite signed measure is given by

for all A in Σ.

This signed measure takes only finite values. To allow it to take +∞ as a value, one needs to replace the assumption about f being absolutely integrable with the more relaxed condition

where f−(x) = max(−f(x), 0) is the negative part of f.

Properties

What follows are two results which will imply that an extended signed measure is the difference of two non-negative measures, and a finite signed measure is the difference of two finite non-negative measures.

The Hahn decomposition theorem states that given a signed measure μ, there exist two measurable sets P and N such that:

P∪N = X and  P∩N = ∅;
μ(E) ≥ 0 for each E in Σ such that E ⊆ P — in other words, P is a positive set;
μ(E) ≤ 0 for each E in Σ such that E ⊆ N — that is, N is a negative set.
Moreover, this decomposition is unique up to adding to/subtracting μ-null sets from P and N.

Consider then two non-negative measures μ+ and μ− defined by

and

for all measurable sets E, that is, E in Σ.

One can check that both μ+ and μ− are non-negative measures, with one taking only finite values, and are called the positive part and negative part of μ, respectively. One has that μ = μ+ − μ−. The measure  |μ| = μ+ + μ− is called the variation of μ, and its maximum possible value, ||μ|| = |μ|(X), is called the total variation of μ.

This consequence of the Hahn decomposition theorem is called the Jordan decomposition. The measures μ+, μ− and  |μ| are independent of the choice of P and N in the Hahn decomposition theorem.

Usage
A measure is given by the area function on regions of the Cartesian plane. This measure becomes a signed measure in certain instances. For example, when the natural logarithm is defined by the area under the curve y = 1/x for x in the positive real numbers, the region with 0  < x < 1 is considered negative.

In  this case the evaluation is a signed measure with the sign corresponding to the sign of y.

When defining directed hyperbolic angles in terms of area of a hyperbolic sector, the line y = x divides quadrant I into positive and negative regions for a signed measure.

The space of signed measures

The sum of two finite signed measures is a finite signed measure, as is the product of a finite signed measure by a real number – that is, they are closed under linear combinations. It follows that the set of finite signed measures on a measurable space (X, Σ) is a real vector space; this is in contrast to positive measures, which are only closed under conical combinations, and thus form a convex cone but not a vector space. Furthermore, the total variation defines a norm in respect to which the space of finite signed measures becomes a Banach space. This space has even more structure, in that it can be shown to be a Dedekind complete Banach lattice and in so doing the Radon–Nikodym theorem can be shown to be a special case of the Freudenthal spectral theorem.

If X is a compact separable space, then the space of finite signed Baire measures is the dual of the real Banach space of all continuous real-valued functions on X, by the  Riesz–Markov–Kakutani representation theorem.

See also

 Complex measure
 Spectral measure
 Vector measure
 Riesz–Markov–Kakutani representation theorem
 Total variation

Notes

References
 

 
 
 
 

Integral calculus
Measures (measure theory)
Wikipedia articles incorporating text from PlanetMath